La Guadalupe is a village and municipality in the Guainía Department, Colombia. La Guadalupe borders  the corregimiento of San Felipe on the north, Brazil on the south and west, and Venezuela on the East.

References

Municipalities of Guainía Department
Populated places on the Rio Negro (Amazon)